José Antonio Rodríguez Martínez (born 23 May 1968) is a Spanish rower. He competed in the men's quadruple sculls event at the 1992 Summer Olympics.

References

External links
 

1968 births
Living people
Spanish male rowers
Olympic rowers of Spain
Rowers at the 1992 Summer Olympics
Sportspeople from Asturias
20th-century Spanish people